The Luzhniki Small Sports Arena (formerly, the Minor Arena of the Central Lenin Stadium) is an 8,700-seat indoor arena that is part of the Luzhniki Sports Complex in Moscow, Russia. The Arena was built in 1956 in the Soviet Union. It hosted volleyball competitions during the 1980 Summer Olympics.

It also hosted events of the 1973 Summer Universiade, 1986 Goodwill Games, Spartakiads of the Peoples of the USSR and others. The arena was the home arena of ice hockey club Dynamo Moscow from 2000–2015.

See also
Luzhniki Olympic Complex

References

External links

 

Indoor ice hockey venues in Russia
Indoor arenas built in the Soviet Union
Indoor arenas in Russia
Volleyball venues in Russia
Sports venues in Moscow
HC Dynamo Moscow
Venues of the 1980 Summer Olympics
Olympic volleyball venues
Kontinental Hockey League venues
Sports venue